Bør Børson Jr. is a 1938 Norwegian comedy film directed by, and starring Toralf Sandø. Conrad Arnesen played a small role in the film. The film is based on a novel by Johan Falkberget.

Bør Børson Jr. (Sandø) is a peasant son with great ambitions. He starts a grocery store and – after some initial problems – makes a good deal of money. He then leaves for Oslo, where he makes a fortune in the stock trade. Eventually, he returns to his hometown, where he holds a lavish wedding with his childhood sweetheart.

External links
 
 Bør Børson jr. at Filmweb.no (Norwegian)
 

1938 films
1938 comedy films
Norwegian comedy films
Norwegian black-and-white films
1930s Norwegian-language films
Films directed by Toralf Sandø